Laurentia is a genus of snout moths described by Émile Louis Ragonot in 1888.

Species
Laurentia albivenella Hampson, 1918
Laurentia inclarella Ragonot, 1888

References

Anerastiini
Pyralidae genera
Taxa named by Émile Louis Ragonot